Spanish Harlem Orchestra is a Latin dance music orchestra based in the United States, founded by Aaron Levinson and Oscar Hernandez.

Their debut album was released in October 2002. The orchestra often tours worldwide.

Discography

Un Gran Dia En El Barrio (2002) 
 "Mama Guela"
 "Obsesion"
 "Tambouri"
 "Aprende A Querer"
 "La Musica Es Mi Vida"
 "La Banda"
 "Pa' Gozar"
 "Somos Iguales"
 "Vale Mas Un Guaguanco"
 "Pueblo Latino"

Across 110th Street (2004)
 "Un Gran Dia En El Barrio"
 "Cuando Te Vea"
 "Tun Tún Suena El Tambor"
 "Dime Se Llegué A Tiempo"
 "Escucha El Ritmo"
 "Bailadores"
 "Te Cantaré"
 "Como Lo Canto Yo"
 "Maestro De Rumbero"
 "La Hija De Lola"
 "Perla Morena"
 "Espérame En El Cielo"
 "Tu Te Lo Pierdes" (Bonus Track)

United We Swing (2007)
 "SHO Intro"
 "Llego La Orquesta"
 "En El Tiempo Del Palladium"
 "Se Forma La Rumba"
 "Sacala Bailar"
 "Ahora Si"
 "Que Bonito"
 "Salsa Pa’l Bailador"
 "Mujer Divina"
 "Soy Candela"
 "Plena Con Sabor"
 "Danzon For My Father"
 "Late In The Evening/Tarde En La Noche"

Viva La Tradicion (2010)
 "La Salsa Dura"
 "Mi Herencia Latina"
 "Son De Corazon"
 "Como Baila Mi Mulata"
 "Si Me Quieres Te Quiero"
 "Baila Latino"
 "La Fiesta Empezo"
 "Nuestra Cancion"
 "Linda"
 "Regalo De Dios"
 "Rumba Urbana"
 "El Negro Tiene Tumbao"

Latinos Unidos 2014
 Latinos Unidos
Caribe soy
Escucha mi son
Bravo soy yo
Canción
Boogachason
This is Mambo
Asi se vive
Dulce compañia
La princesa 
Que lindas son las latinas
Tu y la noche y la música

La Media Vuelta (single), 2018

Anniversary, 2018
Esa Nena - (Marco Bermudez / George Delgado)
Yo Te Prometo - (Gil Lopez / Marco Bermudez)
Dime Tu - (Carlos Castante)
Goza El Ritmo - (Oscar Hernández)
Echa Pa'Lante - (Gil López / Marco Bermudez)
Guaracha Y Bembe - (Cheo Feliciano)
Y Deja - (Rubén Blades)
Canción Para Ti - (Oscar Hernández)
Como Te Quise - (Carlos Castante)
Tres Palabras - (Osvaldo Farrês)
Somos Uno (Feat. Randy Brecker) - (Oscar Hernández)
Soy El Tambor - (Jeremy Bosch)

The Latin Jazz Project, 2020
Ritmo De Mi Gente
Bobo
Invitation
Acid Rain
Las Palmas
Silent Prayers
'Round Midnight
Fort Apache
Latin Perspective
Joe and Oscar
Descarga de Jazz

Awards and nominations 
2005 Grammy Award for Best Salsa/Merengue Album 
2002 Grammy nominee for "Best Salsa Album" 
2003 Latin Billboard Award for  "Salsa Album of the Year-Best New Group"
2010 Grammy Award for "Best Tropical Latin Album"
2019 Grammy Award for Best Tropical Latin Album for Anniversary

References

External links
SHO official page
SHO fan supported website
SHO review

Latin American music
American orchestras
Salsa music groups
Grammy Award winners
Musical groups established in 2002
2002 establishments in New York City
Six Degrees Records artists
ArtistShare artists